Sheykh Neshin (also Romanized as Sheykh Neshīn; also known as Shekhshin) is a village in Sheykh Neshin Rural District, Shanderman District, Masal County, Gilan Province, Iran. At the 2006 census, its population was 740, in 207 families.

References 

Populated places in Masal County